KDB Darulaman (08) is the third ship of the Darussalam-class offshore patrol vessels. The vessel is in active service in the Royal Brunei Navy (RBN).

OPV program 
Brunei ordered the Darussalam class from Lürssen, the same company that Brunei contracted to sell the Nakhoda Ragam-class corvettes, and the first two vessels were delivered in January 2011. The second batch of two ships were delivered by 2014.

Construction and career 
KDB Darulehsan was built by Lürssen Werft company in Germany around the late 2000s. She is part of the second batch delivered from Germany to Brunei. KDB Darulaman was launched on 26 June 2009 and commissioned on 12 August 2011 at Muara Naval Base. All four sister ships work in the offshore patrol vessel role.

MILAN 2012 
During the MILAN 2012, an exercise was hosted by the Indian Navy which KDB Darulaman was also participated.

RIMPAC 2014 

Both RBN ships participated in Exercise RIMPAC in 2014, hosted by the United States Third Fleet off Hawaii. The ships participated in the SINKEX exercise. Darussalam and Darulaman simultaneously fired their Exocet missiles, which struck the target which was the ex-USS Tuscaloosa.

CARAT 2018 
KDB Darulaman,  and  conducted Cooperation Afloat Readiness and Training (CARAT) to strengthen the relations between Brunei Darussalam and United States of America. It took place in the South China Sea on 15 November 2018.

AUMX 2019 
KDB Darulaman, RSS Tenacious, UMS Kyan Sittha, HTMS Krabi,  and  attended the US-ASEAN Maritime Exercise (AUMX) in the Gulf of Thailand on 3 September 2019 and will end in Singapore.

CARAT 2019 
KDB Darulaman, KDB Syafaat,  and  conducted Cooperation Afloat Readiness and Training (CARAT) to strengthen the relations between Brunei Darussalam and United States of America. It took place in the South China Sea on 29 October 2019.

Exercise PELICAN 2019 
Republic of Singapore and Royal Brunei Navy held an exercise which consists of RSS Tenacious, RSS Valour, RSS Vigour,  and KDB Darulaman. All Republic of Singapore Navy ships left on 7 November 2019.

Gallery

Further reading 

 Marine Traffic.com
 Vesseltracker.com
 FleetMon.com
 Information.gov.gb
 CARAT 2019
 RIMPAC 2014

References 

Royal Brunei Navy
Ships of Brunei
2009 ships